The New Hampshire Union Leader is a daily newspaper from Manchester, the largest city in the U.S. state of New Hampshire. On Sundays, it publishes as the New Hampshire Sunday News.

Founded in 1863, the paper was best known for the conservative political opinions of its late publisher, William Loeb, and his wife, Elizabeth Scripps "Nackey" Loeb. The paper helped to derail the candidacy in 1972 of U.S. Senator Edmund Muskie of Maine, who unsuccessfully sought the Democratic presidential nomination. Loeb criticized Muskie's wife, Jane, in editorials. When he defended her in a press conference, there was a measured negative effect on voter perceptions of Muskie within New Hampshire.

Over the decades, the Loebs gained considerable influence and helped shape New Hampshire's political landscape. In 2000, after Nackey's death on January 8, Joseph McQuaid, the son and nephew of the founders of the New Hampshire Sunday News, Bernard J. and Elias McQuaid, took over as publisher. He was succeeded by his son, Brendan, in 2020.

History 
Like many newspapers, the Union Leader has a complex history involving mergers and buyouts.

The weekly Union became the Manchester Daily Union on March 31, 1863. The afternoon Union became a morning Daily Union (dropping the "Manchester"). Although the Union began as a Democratic paper, by the early 1910s it had been purchased by Londonderry politician Rosecrans Pillsbury, a Republican.

In October 1912, the competing Manchester Leader was founded by Frank Knox, later Secretary of the Navy during World War II, and financed by then-Governor Robert P. Bass, a member of the Progressive (or Bull Moose) Party who was attempting to promote the Progressive cause in New Hampshire. The newspaper was so successful that Knox bought out the Union, and the two newspapers merged under the banner of the Union-Leader Corporation July 1913. Owing to Pillsbury's role in the company, both papers espoused a moderate Republican, pro-business stance.

Following Knox's death in 1944, William Loeb purchased the company, merging the Union and Leader into a single morning paper, the Manchester Union-Leader, in 1948. Under Loeb's watch, the Union-Leader moved sharply to the right. He often placed editorials on the front page and supported highly conservative candidates for public office. He dropped Manchester from the paper's masthead in the mid-1970s to emphasize the fact that it is the only statewide newspaper in New Hampshire.

On April 4, 2005, it changed its name to the New Hampshire Union Leader to reflect its statewide reach. However, it is still called the Manchester Union Leader by some residents due to its historical legacy.

The New Hampshire Sunday News was created in 1948 and later, after Loeb's attempts to start a Sunday edition of the Union-Leader failed, was purchased by the Union-Leader Corporation. The Union Leader still publishes the Sunday News as its Sunday edition.

Two notable early employees of the New Hampshire Sunday News were Ralph M. Blagden, the first managing editor, and an even more prominent journalist he mentored, Benjamin C. Bradlee. Bradlee was then a reporter but became executive editor of The Washington Post for nearly 30 years and was its vice president until his death in 2014.

Institutional pedigree 

(Scroll to view more recent mergers and events which are to the right.)

Contributors
 John DiStaso
 Tom Fahey

Editorial style
Throughout their existence, the Union Leader and its predecessors have been closely involved in state politics and during the quadrennial United States presidential election, national politics. Ever since the Loebs bought the paper, its orientation has been unyieldingly conservative (though the paper was already a reliable supporter of the GOP long before the Loebs bought it), a tradition that continued after McQuaid took over the paper. The owner-publishers have invariably made their opinions known in print, which has frequently prompted harsh criticism and accusations that the paper is used for not-entirely-journalistic purposes.

In 2016, the Union Leader endorsed Libertarian candidate Gary Johnson for president—the first time in 100 years that the paper and its predecessors had not endorsed a Republican. In a signed editorial, McQuaid denounced Donald Trump as "a liar, a bully, a buffoon."

In 2020, the Union Leader endorsed Democratic candidate Joe Biden for president, stating, "Building this country up sits squarely within the skill set of Joseph Biden."

Cutbacks

In a message printed in the paper in early 2009, publisher Joseph McQuaid announced that owing to financial difficulties affecting the entire newspaper industry, the Saturday edition of the paper would no longer be distributed outside of the Greater Manchester area and that Saturday content would be moved to a combined Friday/Saturday edition.

In 2015, the paper's flagship building at 100 William Loeb Drive was subdivided into parcels and offered for lease. In 2017, the Union Leader building was sold to investor Peter Levine for $3.8 million after being on the market for about four years. The newspaper leased back space to remain in the building at 100 William Loeb Drive. Three other tenants, two of them charter schools and a distributor, also were occupying space in the building at the time of the sale.

NewHampshire.com
NewHampshire.com is a website created by the New Hampshire Union Leader in 1999 as an information portal for arts and entertainment, community news, recreation and local business information for the state of New Hampshire.

See also 

 Concord Monitor
 Foster's Daily Democrat
 The Keene Sentinel
 The Portsmouth Herald
 The Telegraph (Nashua)

References 

 Cash, Kevin. Who the Hell Is William Loeb? Manchester, NH: Amoskeag Press, 1975.
 Roper, Scott. "Manchester Union-Leader.  In Burt Feintuch and David Watters, editors, Encyclopedia of New England. New Haven, CT:  Yale University Press, 2005.
 Wright, James. The Progressive Yankees:  Republican Reformers in New Hampshire, 1906–1916.  Hanover, NH:  University Press of New England, 1987.

External links
 The Union Leader/New Hampshire Sunday News
 NewHampshire.com
 Neighborhood News, a subsidiary of the Union Leader
 Democracy in Action 1999 transcript of interview with Joseph W. McQuaid
 NHPR 2007 interview with Joseph W. McQuaid, "25 in 25: Joe McQuaid", by Laura Knoy
 NHPR 2001 interview with Joseph W. McQuaid, "Carrying the Torch at the Union Leader", by John Walters

1863 establishments in New Hampshire
Publications established in 1863
Conservative media in the United States
Hillsborough County, New Hampshire
Manchester, New Hampshire
Newspapers published in New Hampshire